Bijoya is a 2019 Bengali film directed by Kaushik Ganguly, produced by Opera Movies and presented by Suparnokanti Karati. It serves as the sequel to Bishorjan (2017) and stars Abir Chatterjee, and Bangladesh actress Jaya Ahsan reprising their roles from the previous film. The movie continues the ending of Bishorjon and explores the story six years later Nasir Ali first met Padma. The film was released on 4 January 2019.

Plot 
Six years after Nasir Ali met Padma and returned to India. Bijoya, the film, has a simple story line that takes forward Bishorjon's ending. The movie opens up with Lau very concerned about Ganesh Mandal, and asking questions to the doctor regarding his heart condition. The doctor suggests Padma and Ganesh to go to Kolkata AMRI Hospital for better treatment. After consulting with a doctor at the hospital, she surprisingly meets Nasir who is working there as a pharmacist. The story unfolds as Nasir learns about his son and Ganesh's heart condition.

Cast 

 Jaya Ahsan as Padma
 Abir Chatterjee as Nasir Ali
 Kaushik Ganguly as Ganesh Mandal
 Lama Halder as Lau

Soundtrack

The film music & background score composed by Indraadip Dasgupta.

Accolades

References

External links 
 

Films directed by Kaushik Ganguly
2019 films
Bengali-language Indian films
2010s Bengali-language films

Films scored by Indradeep Dasgupta